Central American Adventist University (Universidad Adventista de Centro America - UNADECA)  is a Seventh-day Adventist co-educational university located in Alajuela, Costa Rica, and accredited by the Association of Private Universities of Central America and Panama (AUPRICA), the United Association of Private University Rectors of Costa Rica (UNIRE), and the Adventist Accrediting Association.

It is a part of the Seventh-day Adventist education system, the world's second largest Christian school system.

History
Founded in 1925 in Las Cascadas, Panama, UNADECA moved to San Jose, Costa Rica in 1927.  It later moved to Three Rivers in 1932 and finally to Alajuela in 1950.  UNADECA offers undergraduate, graduate and doctoral (IATS) level degrees.

Scandals
UNADECA was the subject of numerous investigations by Costa Rican officials for allegedly falsifying teacher credentials as well as accusations of bribing government officials,  And former student initiated a lawsuit in 2005, related to it.

See also

 List of Seventh-day Adventist colleges and universities
 Seventh-day Adventist education
 Seventh-day Adventist Church
 Seventh-day Adventist theology
 History of the Seventh-day Adventist Church
Adventist Colleges and Universities

References

External links
Official website

Universities and colleges affiliated with the Seventh-day Adventist Church